Maryam Mohamed Fatma Matar (born 1975) is an Emirati geneticist, medical researcher, and radio host, based in the United Arab Emirates (UAE). Matar is the first woman to serve as director-general in the government of Dubai, and is the founder and chairperson of the UAE Genetic Diseases Association.

Education and career
She earned a B.A. in Medicine and Surgery and a degree from the Family Medicine Residency Program. In 2004, she graduated from the H.H. Sheikh Mohammed Bin Rashid Program for Leadership Development, and she worked on a Ph.D. at Yamaguchi University in Japan.

In 2006, Matar was named an undersecretary in the Dubai Government Ministry of Health and in 2008 she was named director-general of a Dubai government agency, Community Development Authority, thereby becoming the first Emirati woman to hold these positions. As of 2014, Matar is the deputy chair of primary education advocacy organization Dubai Cares.

Biography
In 2004, Matar founded and directs the UAE Genetic Diseases Association, a volunteer organization in the UAE that works on issues centering around illnesses such as thalassemia, Alzheimer's, autism, and celiac diseases. This work has led to new screenings for genetic mutations in children, as Matar discussed in a 2017 article in Gulf News, and genetic testing for breast cancer, as Matar discussed in 2018 with the Khaleej Times. She also founded the UAE's Down’s Syndrome Association. In 2017, Matar gave the keynote speech at an event honoring healthcare professionals in the UAE. 

Matar has spoken in the press about rare diseases in the UAE, about periods of time when women should avoid making important decisions, about funding for health care initiatives in the UAE, and challenges for women in the UAE during the COVID-19 pandemic. She has co-hosted a daily radio program, "Akhirlak" about public health in the UAE.

In 2012, Matar was named one of the 100 most powerful Arab women by Arabian Business magazine, and, in April 2015, as one of the "100 most powerful Arabs under 40" in Science. She was recognized by the Islamic Sciences Journal as among the most influential Muslim female scientists, in 2014. Matar has twice been ranked fourth among Arab researchers, as well as "the most powerful Emirati female researcher in science", according to The Arab Weekly, which also reported, in 2018, that Matar aspired to be the first Arab woman to be awarded a Nobel Peace Prize.

Selected publications

References

External links 
, January 17, 2017

Living people
1975 births
Women physicians
Women geneticists
Women medical researchers
Emirati women scientists